Mitchell Tenpenny (born August 17, 1989) is an American country pop singer and songwriter from Nashville, Tennessee. He has released three studio albums and five extended plays through Riser House Records, with the first being Telling All My Secrets released in December 2018. He charted in 2018 with the single "Drunk Me", released on Columbia Records Nashville. He also co wrote "If the Boot Fits" with Granger Smith and the song made it to the top 10 on country airplay.

Early life
Tenpenny was born and raised in Nashville, Tennessee.  His grandmother was Donna Hilley.  According to Tenpenny, when he was 11, his grandmother introduced to him songwriters Bobby Braddock and Curly Putman and he became interested in songwriting.  He grew up listening to country, rock, and R&B, and cited Vince Gill, John Mayer, and Michael Jackson among his musical influences.  He attended Lipscomb Academy in Nashville where he played football. He then enrolled at Middle Tennessee State University where he originally intended to played college football, but became more interested being in a band. He graduated with a music business degree.

Music career

Tenpenny released his debut album, titled Black Crow, in 2015. A track, "Canes Creek", featured the bluegrass band The SteelDrivers.  His debut single was the title track of the album, "Black Crow". In his early songwriting career, he wrote a number of songs with artists such as Nick Fradiani; an early success is the Top 10 song he co-wrote "If the Boot Fits", recorded by Granger Smith.  He signed a publishing deal with Sony ATV Music Publishing Nashville, and was involved in the documentary film The Voyage in 2014. He was signed to a newly formed Riser Records in 2016. On January 10, 2018, it was announced that Tenpenny was signed to a joint venture with Riser House/Sony Music Nashville to a record deal. He will be on the Columbia Records imprint.

In July 2017, Tenpenny released an EP, Linden Ave, named after the street where his grandmother Donna Hilley used to live. The EP charted at No. 10 on Billboard's Independent Albums chart, No. 6 in Heatseekers Albums, and No. 12 in Country Album Sales, with 2,100 copies sold in its first week.

In January 2018, Tenpenny entered into a joint venture with Riser House/Columbia Nashville and released a self-titled EP on February 23, featuring a new single "Drunk Me".

He released his second album and full-length major label debut album titled Telling All My Secrets on December 14, 2018.  It debuted at No. 5 on Billboards Top Country Albums chart, and No. 53 on Billboard 200, after accruing 20,000 album equivalent units in its first week.

Personal life
Tenpenny has been in a long-term relationship with fellow country singer Meghan Patrick. On November 24, 2021, the two got engaged in the bar where they first met. Tenpenny and Patrick married on October 23, 2022.

Discography

Albums

Extended plays

Singles

As lead artist

As featured artist

Promotional singles

Music videos

Awards and nominations

Notes

References

Living people
American country singer-songwriters
Country musicians from Tennessee
Columbia Records artists
1989 births
Singer-songwriters from Tennessee
Middle Tennessee State University alumni